The Gujarat Kensville Challenge was a golf tournament on the Challenge Tour and the Professional Golf Tour of India, played in India. It was held for the first time in January 2011 at Kensville Golf and Country Club in Ahmedabad, Gujarat, and was the season opening event on the tour. It was last played in 2013.

Gaganjeet Bhullar won the inaugural tournament to become the first Indian player to win on the Challenge Tour.

Winners

Notes

References

External links
Coverage on the Challenge Tour's official site

Former Challenge Tour events
Golf tournaments in India
Sports competitions in Ahmedabad
Recurring sporting events established in 2011
Recurring sporting events disestablished in 2013
Defunct sports competitions in India
2011 establishments in Gujarat